The Sotsyalistishe Kinder Farband or SKIF ('Socialist Children's Union', S.K.I.F.) was founded in Eastern Europe as the youth organisation of the Jewish Labour Bund, a Jewish Socialist political party. S.K.I.F has three core ideological principles: Chavershaft ("camaraderie", equality and empathy), Doikayt ("Being here", Jews should live, build their culture and struggle for their rights wherever they dwell, rather than seeking refuge in a Jewish homeland), and Yiddishkeit (Jewish identity through Jewish and Yiddish culture). The plural form of a SKIF member is Skifistn and the leaders who run SKIF are the Helfers, aged 18–20.

The S.K.I.F. in Poland is now defunct. Melbourne S.K.I.F established itself in 1950. Melbourne SKIF, is one of the last remaining SKIF branches, subsequently it is usually regarded as the SKIF organization itself. However, the SKIF in France didn't disband, but in 1963 changed its name to Club laïque de l’Enfance juive, CLEJ.

S.K.I.F. in Poland

In Interwar Poland and in Occupied Poland, various members of the Jewish Resistance were or had been associated with S.K.I.F. One of the leaders of the Warsaw Ghetto Uprising, Marek Edelman had been a S.K.I.F. member, as were members of the underground Jewish Fighting Organization Boruch Pelc and Jurek Błones. Other notable Jewish members included the painter Yosl Bergner, the RAF pilot Rubin Lifszyc and the organizer of children's theater for the poor in the Warsaw Ghetto, Pola Lifszyc. Before World War II, S.K.I.F. organized summer camps for children. Marek Edelman, as a member of the organization, raised funds for playrooms for the children of the poor, in Warsaw.

S.K.I.F. in Melbourne
The S.K.I.F. in Melbourne, Australia, was established in 1950. The first five children held weekly "Sunday meetings". They still have these today, with approximately 25 children attending. By the fourth year of Melbourne SKIF camps, there were enough campers to operate two separate camps. The organisation now runs three camps a year (summer, winter and spring, which is for seniors only) and at its peak has an average camp attendance of eighty children. The final two years of membership are spent in an intensive training course to prepare those who wish to continue as leaders.

Within the Melbourne Jewish Community, it is the only non-Zionist youth movement and the only one to sit outside of the umbrella organization of the Zionist Youth Council. Activities are focused more on broader topics to do with culture, (such as music appreciation,) rather than Israel and Jewish theology. Contrary to popular belief, the organisation is not anti-Zionist.

Whilst a number of activities and names pay homage to the groups socialist, worker past; the SKIF of today has a membership base with a broader political and social orientation.

See also
 Jewish Labour Bund
 Tsukunft
 Camp Hemshekh
Tsukunft shturem

References

External links
Sotsyalistishe Kinder Farband Australia
Interview in Yiddish with members of the Australian S.K.F.
Jewish Labor Bund Melbourne

Ashkenazi Jewish culture in Australia
Bundism in Europe
Jewish organisations based in Australia
Political organisations based in Australia
Youth organisations based in Australia
1950 establishments in Australia
Organisations based in Melbourne
Jews and Judaism in Melbourne
Youth organizations established in 1950
Jewish youth organizations